5-Fluoro-EPT (5F-EPT, 5-fluoro-N-ethyl-N-propyltryptamine) is a psychedelic tryptamine derivative related to drugs such as EPT and 5-MeO-EPT. It acts as a potent full agonist at the 5-HT2A receptor with an EC50 of 5.54 nM and an efficacy of 104% (compared to serotonin). It produces a head-twitch response in animal studies, and is claimed to have antidepressant activity.

See also
 5-Fluoro-AMT
 5-Fluoro-AET
 5-Fluoro-DMT
 5-Fluoro-DET
 5-Fluoro-MET

References 

Psychedelic tryptamines
Tryptamines
Fluoroarenes